Myresjö is a locality situated in Vetlanda Municipality, Jönköping County, Sweden with 646 inhabitants in 2010.

Sports
The following sports clubs are located in Myresjö:

 Myresjö IF

See also
Småland Runic Inscription 99

References 

Populated places in Jönköping County
Populated places in Vetlanda Municipality